Kaline is a given name and a surname.  Notable people with the name include:

Kaline Medeiros (born 1979), Brazilian mixed martial artist 
Al Kaline (1934–2020), American major league baseball player
Colin Kaline (born 1989), American baseball coach and former minor league player